Miss CosmoWorld is a beauty pageant held since 2015 headquartered in Malaysia, under the ownership of Amelia Liew. Amelia herself competed in the 2009 Miss Universe Malaysia contest and participated in a world-level contest, Miss Asia Pageant 2011 in Hong Kong.

The current titleholder is Meiji Cruz from Philippines. She was crowned on the 30th of November 2022.

Miss CosmoWorld Titleholders

Miss CosmoWorld by number of wins

References

Beauty pageants in Malaysia
2015 establishments in Malaysia
Recurring events established in 2015